Alfonso Dal Pian (born 15 August 1957) is an Italian former professional racing cyclist. He rode in one edition of the Tour de France and one edition of the Vuelta a España.

References

External links
 

1957 births
Living people
Italian male cyclists
Sportspeople from Genoa
Cyclists from Liguria